This is a list of members of the first parliament of the South Australian House of Assembly, which sat from 22 April 1857 until 1 March 1860. The members were elected at the inaugural 1857 election.

Notes

References
Statistical Record of the Legislature 1836-2007, Parliament of SA, www.parliament.sa.gov.au

Members of South Australian parliaments by term
19th-century Australian politicians